The President of the Navajo Nation is the Executive Branch of the Navajo Nation. The office was created in 1991 following restructuring of the national government. The President and Vice President are elected every four years. The Navajo Nation President shall serve no more than two consecutive terms.

As outlined in the Navajo Nation Code §1001-1006, until 2016, office holders had to be fluent in the Navajo language among other declared qualifications.  Presently, fluency is to be determined by the Navajo voters when they cast ballots.

Presidential line of succession

The Navajo Nation Code defines who may become or act as president upon the absence of a sitting president or a president-elect. Should the president, under circumstances outlined in the Navajo Nation Code at §1005(d)-1006, be unable to serve out his full term, then the vice president shall act in his place for the remainder of the term, or until the president is able to resume his duties. §1006 of the Code instructs, that in the event a vacancy should "occur in the Office of President and Vice President, the Speaker shall serve as President of the Navajo Nation until a special election is held." The speaker does not relinquish his speaker duties whilst acting as interim president.

Officeholders

See also

 Vice President of the Navajo Nation
 Speaker of the Navajo Nation Council
 The Navajo Nation Council
 Navajo Nation presidential election, 2006
 Navajo Nation presidential election, 2010
 Navajo Nation presidential election, 2015
 Navajo Nation presidential election, 2018
 Navajo Nation presidential election, 2022

References

External links
List of Navajo Leaders

1991 establishments in the United States

Navajo Nation politicians